The Peace and Security Committee of the African Union's Economic, Social and Cultural Council deals with the following issues:

 Conflict anticipation, prevention, management and resolution.
 Post conflict reconstruction and peace building.
 Prevention and combating of terrorism.
 Use of child soldiers.
 Drug trafficking.
 Illicit proliferation of small arms and light weapons.
 Security reforms.

The chairperson of the committee is Muhammed Algalil.

Sectoral Cluster Committees of the Economic, Social and Cultural Council